Martin Fink (born 21 February 1970) is a retired Swiss football striker.

References

1970 births
Living people
Swiss men's footballers
Swiss Super League players
FC Wettingen players
FC Lausanne-Sport players
FC Lugano players
FC Aarau players
FC Luzern players
Association football forwards
Switzerland under-21 international footballers
People from Hochdorf District
Sportspeople from the canton of Lucerne